Jangsan Station is the eastern terminus of the Busan Metro Line 2 located in Jwa-dong, Haeundae District, Busan. The subname in parentheses is Haeundae Baek Hospital.

Station Layout

Gallery

External links 
 Cyber station information from Busan Transportation Corporation 

Railway stations opened in 2002
Busan Metro stations
Haeundae District
2002 establishments in South Korea